Euceratocerus is a genus of death-watch beetles in the family Ptinidae. There are four described species in Euceratocerus.

Species
These four species belong to the genus Euceratocerus:
 Euceratocerus gibbifrons White, 1960 i c g b
 Euceratocerus hornii LeConte, 1874 i c g
 Euceratocerus parvus White, 1974 i c g b
 Euceratocerus argenteus White, 1975 i c g b
Data sources: i = ITIS, c = Catalogue of Life, g = GBIF, b = Bugguide.net

References

Further reading

External links

 

Anobiinae
Bostrichiformia genera